Paradise is the 21st album by industrial band KMFDM. It was released on Metropolis Records and KMFDM Records on September 27, 2019. The album features the band's new core line-up of frontman/principal composer Sascha Konietzko, frontwoman/principal writer Lucia Cifarelli, drummer Andy Selway, and guitarist Andee Blacksugar, along with guest performances from Doug Wimbish, Cheryl Wilson, and on-and-off longtime collaborator Raymond Watts in his first appearance on a KMFDM album since 2003.

Track listing

Personnel 
 Sascha Konietzko - vocals (1, 2, 4-7, 10), bass (1-5, 7-11), synths, drums (2, 3, 6-9, 11), noises (3)
 Lucia Cifarelli - vocals (3-8)
 Andy Selway - drums (1, 4, 5, 10)
 Andee Blacksugar - guitars, melodica (3)

Guest musicians 
 Andrew "Ocelot" Lindsley – vocals (1)
 Cookie - howls (3)
 Lucas Selway - vocals (4)
 Cheryl Wilson – diva vocals (5)
 Doug Wimbish – bass (6)
 Raymond Watts – vocals (9)

Production 
 Sascha Konietzko - production, mixing
 Lucia Cifarelli - production
 Brute! - artwork
 Chris Zander - layout
 Benjamin Lawrenz - mixing, mastering

Charts

References 

2019 albums
KMFDM albums
Metropolis Records albums
Albums produced by Sascha Konietzko